The Smoke Creek Mountains is a mountain range in Washoe County, Nevada at the California border, west of the Smoke Creek Desert.

References 

Mountain ranges of Washoe County, Nevada
Mountain ranges of Nevada